Amit Guluzade; (born 20 November 1992) is an Azerbaijani football player.

Career

Club

Early career
Born in Baku, Guluzade played for Neftçi's youth team before joining the first team.

Kayseri Erciyesspor
On 25 June 2011, Turkish side Kayseri Erciyesspor signed Guluzade to a two-year contract with the option of a third. As part of the transfer, Neftçi stipulated that if Guluzade did not play at least 50% of the club's matches in each year, he could return to Neftçi; and that Erciyesspor could sell Guluzade at any point, but only with Neftçi's approval.

Ravan Baku
After one season in Turkey, Guluzade joined Ravan Baku on 4 July 2012. Guluzade made his debut for Ravan Baku in the first game of the season in a 1–1 home draw with Khazar Lankaran on 5 August 2012.

Gabala
On 9 January 2013, it was announced that Guluzade had signed for Gabala on an 18-month contract. Guluzade made his Gabala debut on 10 February 2013 in a 1–1 home draw against Qarabağ.

Atlético CP
On 21 August 2014, Guluzade joined Atlético CP on a two-year contract.

Sumgayit
On 3 August 2015, Guluzade moved back to Azerbaijan, signing for Sumgayit FK on a one-year contract.

AEL
On 11 January 2017, Guluzade signed a two-and-a-half-year contract with Greek Superleague side Athlitiki Enosi Larissa. On 4 May 2017, he left the team by mutual agreement after having played in only 4 league games.

Milsami Orhei
On 25 June 2020, Guluzade signed for Moldovan side Milsami Orhei.

International
Guluzade appeared 12 times for both the U-17 and U-19's before making the jump to full Azerbaijan squad for some of the 2010 World Cup qualification matches. Guluzade international debut came on 29 May 2010 in a friendly match against Macedonia.

Career statistics

Club

International

Statistics accurate as of match played 2 June 2010

Honours

Club
 Neftçi
 Premyer Liqası
 Winner (1): 2010–11

 Drita
 Superliga e Kosovës
 Winner (1): 2017–18

References

External links

Azerbaijani footballers
1992 births
Living people
Footballers from Baku
Azerbaijan international footballers
Azerbaijan under-21 international footballers
Azerbaijan youth international footballers
Neftçi PFK players
Kayseri Erciyesspor footballers
Ravan Baku FC players
Gabala FC players
Atlético Clube de Portugal players
Sumgayit FK players
Sabail FK players
Athlitiki Enosi Larissa F.C. players
FC Drita players
Super League Greece players
Azerbaijan Premier League players
TFF First League players
Expatriate footballers in Turkey
Azerbaijani expatriate sportspeople in Turkey
Expatriate footballers in Portugal
Azerbaijani expatriate footballers
Association football midfielders